Itaquiraí is a municipality located in the Brazilian state of Mato Grosso do Sul. Its population was 21,376 (2020) and its area is 2,064 km².

References

Municipalities in Mato Grosso do Sul